A distributed social network or federated social network is an Internet social networking service that is decentralized and distributed across distinct service providers (similar to email, but for social networks), such as the Fediverse or the IndieWeb. It consists of multiple social websites, where users of each site communicate with users of any of the involved sites. From a societal perspective, one may compare this concept to that of social media being a public utility.

A social website participating in a distributed social network is interoperable with the other sites involved and is in federation with them. Communication among the social websites is technically conducted over social networking protocols. Software used for distributed social networking is generally portable so it is easily adopted on various website platforms. Distributed social networks contrast with social network aggregation services, which are used to manage accounts and activities across multiple discrete social networks.

A few social networking service providers have used the term more broadly to describe provider-specific services that are distributable across different websites, typically through added widgets or plug-ins. Through the add-ons, the social network functionality is implemented on users' websites.

Differences between distributed and federated networks 
Both kind of networks are decentralized. However, distribution goes further than federation. A federated network has multiple centers, whereas a distributed network has no center at all.

Comparison of software and protocols  

Distributed social network projects generally develop software, protocols, or both. The software is generally free and open source, and the protocols are generally open and free.

Open standards such as OAuth authorization, OpenID authentication, OStatus federation, ActivityPub federation protocol, Nostr, XRD metadata discovery, the Portable Contacts protocol, the Wave Federation Protocol, the Extensible Messaging and Presence Protocol (XMPP) (aka Jabber), OpenSocial widget APIs, microformats like XFN and hCard, and Atom web feeds—increasingly referred to together as the Open Stack—are often cited as enabling technologies for distributed social networking.

History 

The Electronic Frontier Foundation (EFF), a U.S. legal defense organization and advocacy group for civil liberties on the Internet, endorses the distributed social network model as one "that can plausibly return control and choice to the hands of the Internet user" and allow persons living under restrictive regimes to "conduct activism on social networking sites while also having a choice of services and providers that may be better equipped to protect their security and anonymity".

The World Wide Web Consortium (W3C), the main international standards organization for the World Wide Web, launched a new Social Activity in July 2014 to develop standards for social web application interoperability.

In 2013, the Open Mobile Alliance (OMA) released a candidate version of the Social Network Web enabler (SNeW) that was approved in 2016. Its specification is based mainly on OStatus and OpenSocial specifications and designed to meet GDPR recommendations. It is a tentative of the telco industry to establish a operated-led federation of social network services.

References

Further reading 

 Paper on FOAF in an Android environment by Tramp, S., Frischmuth, P., Arndt, N., Ermilov, T., and Auer, S. (2011). Weaving a distributed, semantic social network for mobile users. In Antoniou, G., editor, ESWC 2011, Part I, LNCS 6643, pages 200–214.

External links 

 W3C Social Activity
 W3C Social Web Working Group
 W3C Social Interest Group
 Federated Social Web Conference 2011
 Video by Henry Story demonstrating FOAF in an Android environment
 BuddyCloud
 Mastodon

Distributed computing architecture
Peer-to-peer
Social networks